Events in the year 1978 in Belgium.

Incumbents
Monarch: Baudouin
Prime Minister: Leo Tindemans (to 20 October); Paul Vanden Boeynants (from 20 October)

Events
 11 October – Leo Tindemans proffers his resignation as Prime Minister after the failure of the Egmont pact

Publications
 Rita Lejeune and Jacques Stiennon (eds.), La Wallonie, le Pays et les Hommes: Lettres, Arts, Culture, vol. 1 (La Renaissance du Livre, Brussels

Births

Deaths
 9 October – Jacques Brel (born 1929), singer

References

 
1970s in Belgium
Belgium
Years of the 20th century in Belgium
Belgium